Cadera railway station is a railway station in the municipality of Poschiavo, in the Swiss canton of Graubünden. It is located on the Bernina line of the Rhaetian Railway.

The station has two through tracks, only one of which is served by its single platform. There is a small single story timber station building.

Services
The following services stop at Cadera:

References

External links
 
 

Railway stations in Switzerland opened in 1910
Railway stations in Graubünden
Rhaetian Railway stations
Poschiavo